Kathy Chan (陳凱英) is an American entrepreneur and investor. From 2007 to 2010, Chan worked at Facebook, where she focused on corporate communications and marketing. In 2010, she co-founded investment firm 137 Ventures. In August 2014, she became an operating partner at Khosla Ventures.

Earlier in her career, Chan was involved in U.S. politics. During the 2006 election cycle, she served as deputy campaign manager and interim political committee director for Senator Bob Casey Jr. Previously, she was the director of operations for John Kerry’s 2004 presidential campaign in Pennsylvania.

Chan currently serves as a senior advisor to South by Southwest (SXSW).

References

External links
 Bloomberg executive profile

Living people
American venture capitalists
American people of Chinese descent
Facebook employees
American women in business
Silicon Valley people
Drew University alumni
American financial company founders
Businesspeople from New York City
21st-century Chinese businesspeople
Year of birth missing (living people)
21st-century American women